"T'ain't Nothin' to Me" is a song written by Pat Patterson and performed by The Coasters. The song reached #20 on the R&B chart and #64 on the Billboard Hot 100 in 1964. The song appeared on the 1964 album, Apollo Saturday Night.

The song was produced by Nesuhi Ertegun and Jerry Wexler and arranged by King Curtis.

The song was recorded live on November 16, 1963 at the Apollo Theater in New York City, New York.

References

1964 songs
1964 singles
The Coasters songs
Song recordings produced by Jerry Wexler
Atco Records singles
Songs written by Leon Payne